Kosoklyuchansky is a rural locality (a khutor) in Slashchyovskoye Rural Settlement, Kumylzhensky District, Volgograd Oblast, Russia. The population was 8 as of 2010. There are 3 streets.

Geography 
Kosoklyuchansky is located on the right bank of the Khopyor River, 22 km southwest of Kumylzhenskaya (the district's administrative centre) by road. Ostroukhov is the nearest rural locality.

References 

Rural localities in Kumylzhensky District